Russel "Russ" Prior  (July 11, 1949 – February 17, 2017) was a Canadian weightlifter, who represented Canada at international competitions.

Born in Hamilton, Ontario, Prior first became interested in weightlifting at the age of 15, after reading about the lifting performance of a local resident in a newspaper. His father built a gym in their house's basement, and Prior won multiple events at the CANUSA Games. Three times – in 1970, 1974, and 1978 – Prior won gold medals at the Commonwealth Games, along with those titles, he earned three Pan American Games gold medals. After not being able to compete at the 1972 Summer Olympics due to a back injury, he won the bronze medal in the 110 kg snatch at the 1976 World Weightlifting Championships, lifting 167.5 kg. He participated at the 1976 Summer Olympics in the 110 kg event, and is credited with a ninth-place finish. In 1978, Prior became the Commonwealth record-holder in the 110+ kg clean and jerk, by successfully lifting 210.5 kg. Prior retired from the sport and moved to Winnipeg, where he became a high school teacher.

References

External links
 

1949 births
2017 deaths
Canadian male weightlifters
World Weightlifting Championships medalists
Sportspeople from Hamilton, Ontario
Olympic weightlifters of Canada
Weightlifters at the 1976 Summer Olympics
Weightlifters at the 1970 British Commonwealth Games
Weightlifters at the 1974 British Commonwealth Games
Weightlifters at the 1978 Commonwealth Games
Commonwealth Games medallists in weightlifting
Commonwealth Games gold medallists for Canada
Pan American Games medalists in weightlifting
Pan American Games gold medalists for Canada
Weightlifters at the 1975 Pan American Games
Medalists at the 1975 Pan American Games
Medallists at the 1970 British Commonwealth Games
Medallists at the 1974 British Commonwealth Games
Medallists at the 1978 Commonwealth Games